Vasile Boldescu (born 23 July 1941) is a Romanian ice hockey player. He competed in the men's tournament at the 1968 Winter Olympics.

References

1941 births
Living people
Olympic ice hockey players of Romania
Ice hockey players at the 1968 Winter Olympics
Sportspeople from Bucharest